Dave Quarrie is an English wheelchair curler.

Teams

References

External links 

Living people
English male curlers
English wheelchair curlers
Year of birth missing (living people)
Place of birth missing (living people)